Cryptophorellia is a genus of tephritid  or fruit flies in the family Tephritidae.

Species
Cryptophorellia elongatula Freidberg & Hancock, 1989
Cryptophorellia flava Freidberg & Hancock, 1989
Cryptophorellia longicauda Freidberg & Hancock, 1989
Cryptophorellia madagascariensis Freidberg & Hancock, 1989
Cryptophorellia minuta Freidberg & Hancock, 1989
Cryptophorellia montana Freidberg & Hancock, 1989
Cryptophorellia munroi Freidberg & Hancock, 1989
Cryptophorellia peringueyi (Bezzi, 1924)
Cryptophorellia phaeoptera (Bezzi, 1926)
Cryptophorellia prairiensis Freidberg & Hancock, 1989
Cryptophorellia stenoptera Freidberg & Hancock, 1989
Cryptophorellia stuckenbergi Freidberg & Hancock, 1989
Cryptophorellia tarsata Freidberg & Hancock, 1989
Cryptophorellia trivittata Freidberg & Hancock, 1989
Cryptophorellia vumbaensis Freidberg & Hancock, 1989
Cryptophorellia zombaensis Freidberg & Hancock, 1989

References

Tephritinae
Tephritidae genera
Diptera of Africa